Irene Bluthenthal Geis (born 6 February 1938) is a Chilean journalist, writer, editor, and former television presenter, best known for hosting the program Emisión Cero on  during the 1960s, and Contrapunto and Aire Libre in the early 1970s on the same channel.

Biography
The daughter of German-Jewish parents, Geis was born in Germany and emigrated to Chile with her family in 1939. She returned to Chile to stay in 1977, after leaving for Argentina during the 1973 coup d'état.

She studied journalism at the University of Chile, and her career began at the newspaper La Tercera. While working as editor there, she contributed to the magazines 7 Días – between 26 March 1965 and 9 January 1967 – and Pluma y Pincel, in addition to being director of Fortín Mapocho. During her professional career she has received several honors for her journalistic work, among them the Lenka Franulic Award in 1967 and the 1960s Workshop Award from Casa de las Américas the same year.

In the literary field, Geis's first work was published in 1984 under the title Exiliario, a book compiling 11 of her short stories. In 1996 she published her first novel, Copa de vinagre, to mixed reviews.

In the area of teaching, Geis was a professor and director of the journalism school at the University of Concepción in the early 1970s. Beginning in the 1990s she occupied the same position at the Academy of Christian Humanism University. In addition, in 1998 she became a professor at the University of Chile's School of Journalism.

Works

Fiction
 Exiliario (1984)
 Copa de vinagre (1996)
 Como un pájaro sin luz (2004)
 La pasión de Torquemada (2012)

Academic
 "Los hilos invisibles del deporte": uso ideológico del acontecimiento deportivo en dos diarios de circulación nacional, 1973–1988

References

1938 births
20th-century Chilean women writers
20th-century Chilean novelists
21st-century Chilean women writers
21st-century Chilean novelists
Chilean editors
Chilean journalists
Chilean television presenters
Chilean women journalists
Chilean women editors
Jewish emigrants from Nazi Germany to Chile
Living people
University of Chile alumni
Academic staff of the University of Chile
Academic staff of the University of Concepción
Chilean women television presenters
Chilean women novelists
20th-century Chilean short story writers
Chilean women short story writers
21st-century Chilean short story writers